Las Ánimas complex is an archaeological culture of northern Chile considered to be the immediate precursor to the Diaguita culture. The culture developed in the Chilean region of Norte Chico between 800 and 1000 CE. Prior to Las Ánimas complex, an archaeological culture known as El Molle complex existed in Norte Chico from 300 to 700 CE.

Pottery recovered from Las Ánimas complex has linear designs painted with white, red or black. The black colour derives from specular hematite.

Las Ánimas complex has the earliest evidence for copper metallurgy in Norte Chico.

See also
Chango
Incas in Central Chile
Mapuche history
Tiwanaku

References

Archaeological cultures of South America
Diaguita
History of Atacama Region
History of Coquimbo Region